Awards and nominations received by the 2004 TV series Battlestar Galactica.

Wins

2005 
 Hugo Awards, Best Dramatic Presentation, Short Form ("33")
 Spacey Awards, Favorite Limited TV Series
 Peabody Award

2006
 IGN Awards, Best Television Program
 IGN Awards, Best Sci-Fi Series
 IGN Awards, Best Storyline (New Caprica arc)
 IGN Awards, Editor's Choice Award (Occupation/Precipice)
 IGN Awards, Editor's Choice Award (Exodus, Part 2)
 Leo Awards, Best Lead Performance By A Female in a Dramatic Series, Tricia Helfer ("Pegasus")
 Saturn Awards, Best Syndicated/Cable Television Series
 Saturn Awards, Best Supporting Actor on Television, James Callis
 Saturn Awards, Best Supporting Actress on Television, Katee Sackhoff
 Scream Awards, Best Television Show
 Scream Awards, Most Heroic Performance, Edward James Olmos as Commander William Adama
 Spacey Awards, Best Television Show
 VES Awards, Outstanding Animated Character in a Live Action Broadcast Program, Commercial, or Music Video (Cylon Centurion in "Fragged")

2007
 ALMA Awards, Outstanding Actor in a TV series, mini-series, or TV movie, Edward James Olmos
 Emmy Awards, Outstanding Special Visual Effects for a Series ("Exodus, Part 2")
 RedEye, Best TV Character, Kara Thrace a.k.a. Starbuck
 Saturn Awards, Best Syndicated/Cable Television Series
 VES Awards, Outstanding Models and Miniatures in a Broadcast Program ("Resurrection Ship, Part 2")
 VES Awards, Outstanding Visual Effects in a Broadcast Series, Commercial, or Music Video ("Exodus, Part 1")

2008
 ALMA Awards, Outstanding Actor in a Drama Television Series, Edward James Olmos
 Emmy Awards, Outstanding Special Class - Short-format Live-action Entertainment Programs ("Razor Featurette #4")
 Emmy Awards, Outstanding Special Visual Effects for a Series ("He That Believeth in Me")
 VES Awards, Outstanding Visual Effects in a Broadcast Miniseries, Movie or Special (Razor)

2009
 Emmy Awards, Outstanding Sound Editing For A Series ("Daybreak: Part 2")
 Golden Reel Awards, Best Sound Editing - Short Form Sound Effects and Foley in Television ("He That Believeth in Me")
 Saturn Awards, Best Syndicated/Cable Television Series
 Saturn Awards, Best Television Actor, Edward James Olmos
 Saturn Awards, Best Television Actress, Mary McDonnell
 Television Critics Association Awards, Program of the Year
 VES Award, Outstanding Visual Effects in a Broadcast Series ("BSG space battle, season four")

Nominations

2005
 Emmy Awards, Outstanding Special Visual Effects for a Series ("33")
 Emmy Awards, Outstanding Special Visual Effects for a Series ("The Hand of God")
 Nebula Awards, Best Script ("Act of Contrition/You Can't Go Home Again" by Carla Robinson & Bradley Thompson & David Weddle)
 VES Awards, Outstanding Performance by an Animated Character in a Live Act on Broadcast Program ("33")

2006
 ALMA Awards, Outstanding Actor in a Television Series, Edward James Olmos
 Emmy Awards, Outstanding Special Visual Effects for a Series ("Resurrection Ship, Part 2")
 Emmy Awards, Outstanding Costumes for a Series ("Lay Down Your Burdens, Part 2")
 Emmy Awards, Outstanding Single-Camera Sound Mixing for a Series ("Scattered")
 Hugo Awards, Best Dramatic Presentation - Short Form ("Pegasus")
 Nebula Awards, Best Script ("Unfinished Business" by Michael Taylor)
 Scream Awards, Most Heroic Performance, Edward James Olmos as Commander William Adama
 Scream Awards, Breakout Performance, Tricia Helfer as Number Six
 Scream Awards, Breakout Performance, Katee Sackhoff as Starbuck
 Saturn Awards, Best Supporting Actor on Television, Jamie Bamber
 Saturn Awards, Best Television Release on DVD (Season 1)
 Saturn Awards, Best Television Release on DVD (Season 2.0)
 VES Awards, Outstanding Animated Character in a Live Action Broadcast Program, Commercial, or Music Video (Cylon in "Valley of Darkness")

2007
 Emmy Awards, Outstanding Directing for a Drama Series ("Exodus, Part 2")
 Emmy Awards, Outstanding Writing for a Drama Series ("Occupation/Precipice")
 Emmy Awards, Outstanding Sound Editing for a Series ("Exodus, Part 2")
 Hugo Awards, Best Dramatic Presentation - Short Form ("Downloaded")
 Saturn Awards, Best Actor in a Television Program, Edward James Olmos
 Saturn Awards, Best Actress in a Television Program, Katee Sackhoff
 Saturn Awards, Best Supporting Actor in a Television Program, James Callis
 Scream Awards, The Ultimate Scream
 Scream Awards, Best Television Show
 Spacey Awards, Favourite Character You Love to Hate, Gaius Baltar
 VES Awards, Outstanding Animated Character in a Live Action Broadcast Program, Commercial or Music Video ("Downloaded")
 VES Awards, Outstanding Compositing in a Broadcast Program, Commercial or Music Video ("Resurrection Ship, Part 2")
 Writers Guild of America, Television Award ("Occupation/Precipice")

2008
 Emmy Awards, Outstanding Cinematography for a One Hour Series (Razor)
 Emmy Awards, Outstanding Sound Mixing for a Comedy or Drama Series (one-hour) (Razor)
 Emmy Awards, Outstanding Writing for a Drama Series ("Six of One")
 Emmy Awards, Outstanding Single-camera Picture Editing for a Drama Series ("He That Believeth in Me")
 Hugo Awards, Best Dramatic Presentation - Short Form (Razor)
 People's Choice Awards, Favorite Sci-Fi Show
 Saturn Awards, Best Syndicated/Cable Television Series
 Saturn Awards, Best Television Presentation (Razor)
 Saturn Awards, Best Television Actor, Edward James Olmos
 Scream Awards, Best Television Actress, Tricia Helfer
 Scream Awards, Best Television Actor, Edward James Olmos
 Scream Awards, Best Television Show
 VES Awards, Outstanding Visual Effects in a Broadcast Series ("Maelstrom")

2009
 Emmy Awards, Outstanding Directing for a Drama Series ("Daybreak: Part 2")
 Emmy Awards, Outstanding Single-Camera Picture Editing For A Drama Series ("Daybreak: Part 2")
 Emmy Awards, Outstanding Sound Mixing For A Comedy Or Drama Series (One Hour) ("Daybreak: Part 2")
 Emmy Awards, Outstanding Special Visual Effects For A Series ("Daybreak: Part 2")
 Emmy Awards, Outstanding Special Class - Short-format Live-Action Entertainment Programs ("Battlestar Galactica: The Face of the Enemy")
 Hugo Awards, Best Dramatic Presentation - Short Form ("Revelations")
 Saturn Awards, Best Television Supporting Actress, Katee Sackhoff
 Scream Awards, Best Ensemble
 Scream Awards, Best Science Fiction Actress, Katee Sackhoff
 VES Awards, Outstanding Visual Effects in a Broadcast Series

Other honors

2005
 American Film Institutes Top 10 Television Shows of the Year
 American Film Institutes Moments of significance 2005: Movies and Television Picture a Post 9/11 World
 Times Best of 2005: Television (#1)
 TV Guides and TV Land's The 100 Most Unexpected TV Moments for "Kobol's Last Gleaming, Part 2" (#98)
 Chicago Tribunes Top 10 TV shows of 2005
 Newsdays Top 10 TV shows of 2005 (#1)
 Pittsburgh Post-Gazettes Top 10 TV shows of 2005 (#1)

2006
 American Film Institutes Top 10 Television Shows of the Year
 Times Best of 2006: Television (#7)
 Chicago Tribunes Top 10 TV shows of 2006
 Entertainment Weeklys Top 10 TV Shows of 2006 (#3)
 Metacritics Top TV shows of 2006 (#2)
 Arizona Republics Top 10 TV shows of 2006 (#7)
 Newsdays Top 10 TV Shows of 2006 (#3)
 Pittsburgh Post-Gazettes Top 10 TV shows of 2006 (#3)
 San Jose Mercury-Newss Top TV shows of 2006 (#5)
 Salon.com Buffy Award for Season 3 of Battlestar Galactica "the most underappreciated show in all of TV land"
 TV Guides Top 10 TV Shows of 2006 (#5)

2007
 Entertainment Weekly, Best 25 Science Fiction of the Past 25 Years (#2)
 Times The 100 Best TV Shows of All-TIME
 The New York Times Top 10 TV Shows of 2007 (#8)
 Box Office Prophetss Calvin Awards, Best Television Show (#1)

2008
 Times Top 10 TV Series of 2008 (#8)
 Times Top 10 TV Episodes of 2008 (#6 - "Revelations")
 Chicago Tribunes Top 10 TV shows of 2008 (#3) 
 TV Guides Best Shows of 2008
 New Jersey Star-Ledgers Top 10 TV shows of 2008 (#7)
 Television Without Pitys Tubey Awards: Best Drama, Best Cast
 San Francisco Chronicles Top 25 TV shows of 2008 (#4)
 Box Office Prophetss Calvin Awards, Best Television Show (#3)

2009
 Time "Top 10 TV Series of 2009" (#5)
 AOLs 50 Best TV Dramas Ever (#12)
 TV Guide "Top 100 [U.S.] Episodes of All-Time (2009)". (Blood on the Scales, #43)

2010
 Boston.com "Top 50 Science Fiction Television Shows of All Time" (#1)

2011
 IGN.com "Top 50 Sci-Fi Shows" (#1)

See also
 List of awards and nominations received by Battlestar Galactica (miniseries)
 List of awards and nominations received by Battlestar Galactica: Razor

References

Awards
Battlestar Galactica